Javier García Ordóñez (born 16 June 1992) is a Spanish rower. He competed at the 2020 Summer Olympics, held July–August 2021 in Tokyo.

References

External links

1992 births
Living people
Spanish male rowers
Olympic rowers of Spain
Rowers at the 2020 Summer Olympics
Sportspeople from Seville
World Rowing Championships medalists for Spain
21st-century Spanish people